The 2018 Úrvalsdeild kvenna is the 47th season of the women's football top-level league in Iceland. Þór/KA is the defending champion. The season is scheduled to begin on 3 May and to conclude on 22 September.

Teams
The 2018 Úrvalsdeild kvenna is contested by ten teams, eight of which played in the division the previous year and two teams promoted from 1. deild kvenna. The bottom two teams from the previous season, Haukar and Fylkir, were relegated to the 1. deild kvenna and were replaced by HK/Víkingur and Selfoss, champions and runners-up of the 2017 1. deild kvenna respectively.

Club information

Source: Scoresway

League table

References

External links
 Official website

Isl
Icell
1
2018